Prostanthera linearis, commonly known as narrow-leaved mint-bush is a species of flowering plant in the family Lamiaceae and is endemic to eastern Australia. It is an erect, faintly aromatic shrub with glabrous, narrow egg-shaped to linear leaves and white flowers that are often tinged with pinkish-mauve.

Description

Taxonomy
Prostanthera linearis was first formally described in 1810 by Robert Brown in his book Prodromus Florae Novae Hollandiae. The specific epithet (linearis) refers to the shape of the leaves.

Distribution and habitat
Narrow-leaved mint-bush grows in eucalyptus forest, often by streams in sandy or gravelly clay soils and occurs in Queensland and from Sydney, south to Milton.

Conservation status
This mintbush is classified as of "least concern" under the Queensland Government ''Nature Conservation Act 1992.

References

linearis
Flora of New South Wales
Flora of Queensland
Lamiales of Australia
Plants described in 1810
Taxa named by Robert Brown (botanist, born 1773)